14th ADG Awards
February 5, 2010

Period Film:
Sherlock Holmes

Fantasy Film:
Avatar

Contemporary Film:
The Hurt Locker

The 14th Art Directors Guild Awards, which were given on February 5, 2010, honored the best production designers of 2009.

Winners and nominees

Film
 Period Film: 
 Sarah Greenwood – Sherlock Holmes
 David Wasco – Inglourious Basterds
 Mark Ricker – Julie & Julia
 Nathan Crowley – Public Enemies
 Jess Gonchor – A Serious Man

 Fantasy Film: 
 Rick Carter and Robert Stromberg – Avatar
 Philip Ivey – District 9
 Stuart Craig – Harry Potter and the Half-Blood Prince
 Scott Chambliss – Star Trek
 K. K. Barrett – Where The Wild Things Are

 Contemporary Film: 
 Karl Juliusson – The Hurt Locker
 Allan Cameron – Angels & Demons
 Bill Brzeski – The Hangover
 Namoi Shohan – The Lovely Bones
 Steve Saklad – Up in the Air

External links
 The winners and nominees on the official website

2009 film awards
2009 guild awards
Art Directors Guild Awards
2010 in American cinema